Ismaïl Makhlouf Stadium is a multi-use stadium in Larbaâ, Algeria. It is currently used mostly for football matches stadium is the home ground of RC Arbaâ.  The stadium holds 7,000 spectators.

It bears the name of an Algerian revolutionary Ismail Makhlouf, former goalkeeper of the RCA and member of the FLN. In a match of his team at the Larbaâ, it was hunted and killed by the colonial army between halftime, he died by wearing the shirt of his club. Well and honor him, the main stadium of the city of Larbaâ bore his name since independence of Algeria.

References

Ismail Makhlouf
Buildings and structures in Blida Province